Sonkajärvi (formerly known as Rutakko) is a municipality of Finland. The municipality is unilingually Finnish.

The coat of arms of Sonkajärvi is inspired by the many watermills in the region, which the picture of the water wheel refers to, and the slash-and-burn cultivation of the past, which the flames on top of the wheel refer to. The coat of arms was designed by Ahti Hammar, and the Sonkajärvi municipal council approved it at its meeting on July 15, 1954. The Ministry of the Interior approved the coat of arms for use on October 15 of the same year.

Geography
Neighbouring municipalities are Iisalmi, Kajaani, Lapinlahti, Rautavaara, Sotkamo and Vieremä.

Nature
There are 204 lakes in the area of Sonkajärvi. Biggest of them are Laakajärvi, Sälevä and Kiltuanjärvi.

There are unique nature sights in the municipality of Sonkajärvi, for example the northernmost in Finland reliably confirmed habitats of wild small-leaved lime (Tilia cordata) in the vicinity of the lake of Kangaslampi, 63° 45′ N and near the hill of Salmisenmäki, 63° 43′ 42" N.

History

The municipality was founded in 1922. Before it Sonkajärvi was a part of Iisalmen maalaiskunta.

Transport

Wife carrying competition
Sonkajärvi has gained a worldwide fame for the alternative sport of wife-carrying ( or ). The first Wife Carrying World Championship dates to 1994, but the creation of the contest, apart from its humorous aspects, has deep roots in the local history. In the late 19th century there was in the area a brigand called Rosvo-Ronkainen, who is said to have accepted in his troops only those men who proved their worth on a challenging track. In those days, it was also a common practice to steal women from the neighbouring villages.

In the Wife Carrying competition each team has one male and one female member, the objective being for the male to carry the female through a special obstacle track. The basic rules are that the woman must be over 17 years of age and have a weight of at least . If she is below that weight, she must be burdened with such a heavy rucksack so that the total weight to be carried by the man is at least 49 kilograms. The only equipment allowed is a belt worn by the carrier.

Notable people 
Päivi Räsänen, politician

International relations

Twin towns — Sister cities
 Väike-Maarja Parish, Estonia (since 1997)

References

External links

 Municipality of Sonkajärvi – Official site 

 
Populated places established in 1922